Joshua Ikhaghomi (born 13 July 1975) is a Nigerian swimmer. She competed in two events at the 1992 Summer Olympics.

References

1975 births
Living people
Nigerian female swimmers
Olympic swimmers of Nigeria
Swimmers at the 1992 Summer Olympics
Place of birth missing (living people)
African Games medalists in swimming
Competitors at the 1991 All-Africa Games
African Games silver medalists for Nigeria
African Games bronze medalists for Nigeria
20th-century Nigerian women
21st-century Nigerian women